A coast (or coastal) radio station (short: coast station) is an on-shore maritime radio station which may monitor radio distress frequencies and relays ship-to-ship and ship-to-land communications.

A coast station (also:  coast radio station ) is – according to article 1.75 of the International Telecommunication Union's (ITU) ITU Radio Regulations (RR) – defined as «A land station in the maritime mobile service.»

See also
 Marconi Station
 Utility station
 KPH - A preserved RCA coastal wireless station in California
 WCC - A former coastal wireless station on Cape Cod, now operating from Maryland
 Portishead Radio - former UK station

References / sources 

 International Telecommunication Union (ITU)

Radio stations and systems ITU
Maritime communication